Scare PewDiePie (stylized in all caps) is an American comedy horror reality web series that stars Swedish YouTube personality Felix Kjellberg, known professionally as PewDiePie. The series was produced by Maker Studios (now Disney Digital Network) and Skybound Entertainment, with Robert Kirkman serving as executive producer, and premiered on February 10, 2016 exclusively for YouTube Red (now called YouTube Premium), the paid subscription arm of YouTube. Episodes feature Kjellberg exploring sets designed and based on horror video games that he played and commented over on his YouTube channel.

Ten episodes were produced and filmed in Los Angeles, California during September 2015. A second season, titled Scare PewDiePie: Multiplayer, was set to be released on March 9, 2017, but the show was cancelled before its release due to scandals involving Kjellberg.

Plot
In the series, PewDiePie encounters terrifying situations and sets inspired by his favorite survival horror video games he previously played on his YouTube channel. In some episodes, he is joined by other YouTubers, who follow and help him, including Mark Fischbach (Markiplier), Ian Hecox and Anthony Padilla of Smosh, Arin Hanson of the Game Grumps, and Matthew Patrick (MatPat).

Production

Development
In September 2015, PewDiePie announced through a vlog that he was working with a camera crew to shoot a show on location in Los Angeles. At the time, PewDiePie did not reveal whether it was to be shot for a television or online audience, confirming that he could not speak too much about the show's details at the time.

In October 2015, YouTube announced YouTube Red, its paid subscription service that would offer subscribers an ad-free experience and the ability to download videos for offline viewing. It was announced that the service would be launching original content exclusive to YouTube Red subscribers in 2016. This original content was announced to include Scare PewDiePie, the aforementioned series hinted at by PewDiePie. Skybound Entertainment and Maker Studios were announced as producers of the show.

After the series was announced, PewDiePie spoke about his experience shooting the series, stating, "Shooting a show like this in a completely new format has been so much fun," and adding, "we just wrapped shooting but I still feel unsure every day if I'm safe or not from another scare." During a press release, Skybound's co-founder, Robert Kirkman, stated, "Working with Felix, YouTube, and Maker Studios on this venture has been creatively exhilarating and just plain fun. I trust audiences will love the show as much as we loved creating it."

Renewal and cancellation
On June 23, 2016, YouTube announced that Scare PewDiePie would be renewed for a second season, to be titled Scare PewDiePie: Multiplayer, in which PewDiePie would be joined by fellow YouTuber jacksepticeye. However, on February 14, 2017, YouTube announced that Scare PewDiePie was cancelled following a series of anti-Semitic jokes made by Kjellberg on his YouTube channel.

On March 14, 2017, PewDiePie released a comedic video that included a fake first episode of Scare PewDiePie: Season 2. Despite initially stoking online speculation that he would release the second season, PewDiePie confirmed in the video that this would be impossible for legal reasons. He did express regret that the season would not be seen by the public, saying, "It's a shame, it's a damn shame."

Episodes

Reception
The show was not well-received by critics, despite receiving support from viewers and PewDiePie fans. Erik Kain wrote for Forbes that the seventh episode (the only episode offered for free to non-YouTube Red viewers) was "terrible." Despite calling PewDiePie "a hard worker" and "a charismatic presence onscreen," Kain suggested that the show was not good enough to justify paying for it, writing: "It's just... maybe if you're a PewDiePie fan you might enjoy it, but I'd rather watch that one Brazilian elevator prank over and over again than this. And I can watch that on YouTube without a $10/month subscription."

Writing for Variety, Brian Lowry said that the show "has a decidedly not-ready-for-primetime feel." Despite expressing optimism that YouTube Red would produce better content in the future, his review of the free episode was overwhelmingly negative, at one point reading: "Even with a relentless barrage of spooky sound effects and funky camera angles – and a creative pedigree that includes producers from The Walking Dead – it’s hard to imagine anything but the most committed bros (referring to PewDiePie fans) being anything but bored."

When the show was initially released, some of PewDiePie’s fans felt upset that he had "sold out" by starring in a series produced by a corporation rather than himself. However, when the series was cancelled, many fans rallied around PewDiePie and the show itself, feeling that the second season should have been released and that Kjellberg was being treated unfairly.

References

External links
 
 Series playlist on YouTube
 

2016 American television series debuts
2016 American television series endings
2016 web series debuts
2016 web series endings
Maker Studios videos
PewDiePie
Skybound Entertainment titles
YouTube Premium original series